John Doyle (abt. 1828 – August 1892) was an Irishman who served in the 8th King's Royal Irish Hussars (a light cavalry unit) as a Private soldier during the Crimean War and the Indian Rebellion of 1857.

Life
Doyle was born at Birr, County Offaly, Ireland, about 1828 and died at Liverpool, England in August 1892.

Doyle enlisted in the British Cavalry at Newbridge, Ireland in 1850.  His brother, Patrick, had signed up as an infantryman and died when his transport, HMS Birkenhead, struck a reef off Cape Agulhas, South Africa.
He rode in the Charge of the Light Brigade at Balaklava and survived, lightly wounded but not captured.

Achievements 
Doyle fought at four major Crimean War battles: Alma, Balaklava, Inkerman, and Sebastopol. He was a member of the Balaclava Commemoration Society, made up of survivors of the Charge of the Light Brigade of 1854.

In Manchester in 1877 he published a memoir of his service titled A Descriptive Account of the Famous Charge of the Light Brigade at Balaclava.

References
UK Census 1851, District Cavalry Barracks, Preston, Sussex [H.O. 107 1647]

1828 births
1892 deaths
8th King's Royal Irish Hussars soldiers
People from County Offaly
British Army personnel of the Crimean War
British military personnel of the Indian Rebellion of 1857